Amadee Wohlschlaeger (December 3, 1911 – June 24, 2014) was a 20th-century American sports cartoonist in St. Louis. He was known professionally as simply "Amadee", which was how he signed his cartoons. He was a long-time sports cartoonist for the St. Louis Post-Dispatch, in an era when newspaper sports pages usually included a prominent cartoon. He drew the Weatherbird cartoon for more than 49 years.

Life and career
Wohlschlaeger was born on December 3, 1911, in St. Louis and grew up in the Carondelet neighborhood in the far south of that city, where he developed a passion for drawing when a small child. He did not attend high school (although he did later take art classes at Washington University). His father was a printer with the St. Louis Post-Dispatch, and the younger Wohlschlaeger took a job there at age 14, as a copy boy earning $7.50 (about $ in  dollars) a week. In 1929, at age 17, he was hired into the paper's art department.

In 1932, Wohlschlaeger became the fourth artist to draw the Post-Dispatch's Weatherbird, which was created in 1901 and remains in continuous daily use. He drew the Weatherbird, usually accompanied by a pithy observation on current events, from 1932 to 1981. His Weatherbird marked D-Day, the assassination of John F. Kennedy, and many other notable events.

Wohlschlaeger drew his first sports cartoon for the paper in 1936. Among his contributions was his "Cardinals Camp Capers" cartoon, sent in from spring training.

In 1939, he filled in as the Post-Dispatch's editorial cartoonist, drawing caricatures of Hitler and Mussolini as well as local politicians.

Wohlschlaeger drew many covers for the Sporting News, which was then produced in St. Louis and known as "The Baseball Bible". He also drew covers for University of Missouri football programs for more than 30 years, and covers for the annual St. Louis Baseball Writers dinner.

Wohlschlaeger retired in 1981. He was inducted into the Missouri Sports Hall of Fame in 1992.

Wohlschlaeger was married to Violet Wohlschlaeger; they had a son, Amadee Wohlschlaeger Jr. Wohlschlaeger died June 24, 2014, in St. Louis County.

References

Publications

1911 births
2014 deaths
American cartoonists
American comics artists
American centenarians
Men centenarians
Artists from St. Louis
Washington University in St. Louis alumni